Andriy Oleksiyovych Vorobey (born 29 November 1978) is a Ukrainian retired football striker. He was a three times national champion while playing for FC Shakhtar Donetsk. In 2000 the magazine Komanda recognized him as the best player in the league. During his career Vorobey netted over 100 goals in the Ukrainian Premier League, while in the 2000-01 season he became the league's top scorer.

When playing for the national team he was second striker under Andriy Shevchenko. While playing in Shakhtar Donetsk he started as a centre forward, but he became second striker behind Brandão.

Career

Shakhtar Donetsk
Vorobey started his career in Shakhtar Donetsk in 1994. He was promoted to the senior team in 1997.  In the 2000–01 season Vorobey was the leading scorer with 21 goals. He amassed 79 goals in 209 matches in the Ukrainian Premier League playing for Shakhtar Donetsk. His total career for the Shakhtar senior team lasted ten years.

In 2000/01 he set the Ukraine Premier League record for scoring goals in games in a row, 9 goals in 7 games.

Dnipro
Vorobey signed a three-year contract with FC Dnipro Dnipropetrovsk on 17 June 2007. He scored his first goal in European Competition for FC Dnipro Dnipropetrovsk in the 2007–08 UEFA Cup, in a 1–1 draw with Aberdeen, however Dnipro were eliminated by Aberdeen on the away goal rule.

Metalist
On 28 May 2010 it was officially announced that Vorobey had signed a two-year contract at Metalist.

International career
Vorobey has been on the Ukraine national football team since 2000. Notably, he was on Ukraine's FIFA World Cup 2006 squad, where Ukraine got to the quarterfinals losing to their champions Italy. 

His last goal for Ukraine was in the UEFA Euro 2008 Qualifying match against Faroe Islands, which Ukraine won 5–0. Vorobey scored the last goal of the match in the 64th minute.

Career statistics

Club

As of 22 April 2013

International

Honours

Shakhtar Donetsk
Ukrainian Premier League (3): 2001–02, 2004–05, 2005–06
Ukrainian Cup (3): 2000–01, 2001–02, 2003–04
Ukrainian Super Cup (1): 2005

Personal
Ukrainian Premier League Top Scorer (1): 2000–01
Ukrainian Footballer of the Year (Komanda) (1): 2000
Ukrainian Cup Top Scorer (3): 2000–01, 2001–02, 2002–03

References

External links

 
 Andriy Vorobey at Official Metalist website
 Profile on website Football Ukraine (in Russian)

1978 births
Living people
Footballers from Donetsk
Ukrainian footballers
Ukraine international footballers
2006 FIFA World Cup players
FC Shakhtar Donetsk players
FC Shakhtar-2 Donetsk players
FC Dnipro players
FC Arsenal Kyiv players
FC Metalist Kharkiv players
FC Helios Kharkiv players
Ukrainian Premier League players
Ukrainian Premier League top scorers
Association football forwards
Ukrainian Cup top scorers